A World War I Memorial by Albert Henry Atkins is installed in Adams Square, in Boston, Massachusetts, United States. The 1922 stone memorial is approximately 8 x 12 x 1 ft. and features a relief of a standing female in classical attire. An inscription on the front reads: .  The artwork was surveyed as part of the Smithsonian Institution's "Save Outdoor Sculpture!" program in 1997.

References

1922 establishments in Massachusetts
1922 sculptures
Monuments and memorials in Boston
Outdoor sculptures in Boston
Sculptures of women in Massachusetts
World War I memorials in the United States